Riverside Cemetery is a historic cemetery located near Lowman, Chemung, Chemung County, New York. It was established in the 1790s, and contains graves dating from then to the present. It has a cast iron gate archway inscribed "Riverside Cemetery" and dated to about 1900. The cemetery includes the graves of many early settlers and Revolutionary War soldiers. Notable burials include Lieutenant Governor Seymour Lowman (1868–1940).

It was added to the National Register of Historic Places in 2012.

References

External links
 

Cemeteries on the National Register of Historic Places in New York (state)
1795 establishments in New York (state)
Buildings and structures in Chemung County, New York
National Register of Historic Places in Chemung County, New York